Jade Dynasty, also known as Jade Dynasty 1 and Zhu Xian, is a 2019 Chinese fantasy action film directed by Ching Siu-tung and starring Xiao Zhan, Li Qin, Meng Meiqi, and Tang Yixin. The film is adapted from Xiao Ding's eponymous novel. The film was released in China on September 13, 2019.

Plot
The film follows the story of Zhang Xiaofan, a kindhearted and pure village boy who is thrown into a world of chaos after his village gets massacred, and then becomes a disciple of the Qingyun Sect. Zhang Xiaofan learns martial arts from three masters and becomes a master of the mythical realm, while at the same time, experiencing a complicated relationship with three beautiful girls, Lu Xueqi, Tian Ling'er, and Bi Yao.

Cast
 Xiao Zhan as Zhang Xiaofan
 Meng Meiqi as Bi Yao
 Li Qin as Lu Xueqi
 Tang Yixin as Tian Ling'er
 Qiu Xinzhi as Tian Buyi
 Cecilia Yip as Master Shuiyue
 David Chiang as Reverend Daoxuan
 Norman Chui as Reverend Cangsong
 Bryan Leung as Zeng Shuqiang
 Bao Xiaosong as Shang Zhengliang
 Chen Liwei as Reverend Tianyun
 Li Shen as Lin Jingyu

Production
The film was shot on locations in Beijing, Sichuan, Henan, and Hebei between October 16, 2018 and January 29, 2019.

Reception
The film topped the Chinese mainland box office on its day of release, grossing 142.22 million yuan.

In Thailand, the  Jade Dynasty creates new record for its ticket sale rate of domestic movies for the first time in 10 years.

Soundtrack

Release
Jade Dynasty was slated for release on August 8, 2019 in China but was postponed to September 12, 2019. The release date was later shifted to September 13, 2019.

References

External links
 
 
 

2019 films
2010s fantasy action films
Chinese fantasy action films
Films shot in Beijing
Films shot in Sichuan
Films shot in Henan
Films shot in Hebei
Zhu Xian
Films directed by Ching Siu-tung
2010s Mandarin-language films